This list is about current match officials in Chinese Super League, include referees and assistant referees.

Match officials 

As of December 2019.

Referees

References 

Chinese Super League